Line 7 is a northwest–southeast line of the Shanghai Metro network. It connects the Baoshan District of Shanghai with the downtown core as well as the Pudong New Area and the Expo 2010 site. The line is colored orange on system maps.

History
 Construction began on November 24, 2005.
 The first section of the line from Huamu Road to Shanghai University opened to the public on December 5, 2009.
In the first few months of operation, the trains only operated from 9AM-4PM to allow for extended testing of the line.
On February 20, 2010, operating hours have been extended to fall in line with the rest of the metro system afterwards.
On April 20, 2010, Houtan station entered operation.
In December 2010, three stations on the northern extension of the line opens.
In June 2011, two more stations on the northern extension of the line opens.
In July 2014, Qihua Road station entered operation.

Stations

Service routes

Important stations
  station, which serves the Shanghai University.
  station is a station where line 7 crosses lines 3 and 4.
  station, located under the busy Nanjing Road, is an interchange with line 2.

Future expansions
There are no current extensions planned.

Station name change
 On June 6, 2012, Chuanchang Road was renamed .

Headways 
<onlyinclude>

Technology

Signalling

Rolling Stock

References

Shanghai Metro lines
 
Railway lines opened in 2009
2009 establishments in China